The Tenoderinae are a subfamily of praying mantids, originally used by Brunner von Wattenwyl.  It was restored as part of a major revision of mantid taxonomy, and contains many genera previously placed in the subfamily Mantinae.

The new placement means that this taxon is part of the superfamily Mantoidea (of group Cernomantodea) and infraorder Schizomantodea.  Species have been recorded from: Africa, Europe and Asia.

Tribes and genera 
This new subfamily now contains many genera that were previously placed elsewhere including the Mantinae.  The Mantodea Species File lists two tribes here:

Paramantini 
subtribe Paramantina
 Alalomantis Giglio-Tos, 1917
 Epitenodera Giglio-Tos, 1911
 Paramantis Ragge & Roy, 1967
 Rhomboderella Giglio-Tos, 1912
 Sphodromantis Stal, 1871
subtribe Tarachomantina
 Mantasoa Mériguet, 2005
 Nausicaamantis Meriguet, 2018
 Tarachomantis Brancsik, 1892
 Tisma Giglio-Tos, 1917

Tenoderini 
subtribe Polyspilotina
 Cataspilota Giglio-Tos, 1917
 Plistospilota Giglio-Tos, 1911
 Polyspilota Burmeister, 1838
 Prohierodula Bolivar, 1908
subtribe Tenoderina
 Mesopteryx Saussure, 1870
 Notomantis Tindale, 1923
 Tenodera Burmeister, 1838
 Tenospilota Roy & Ehrmann, 2014

References

External links 
 
 

Mantodea subfamilies
Mantidae